Herbert Walter Naismith (9 October 1915 – 17 June 1995) was an Australian rules footballer who played with Collingwood in the Victorian Football League (VFL).

His father Wally Naismith, paternal uncle Charlie Naismith, maternal uncle Alf Dummett and brother Alby Naismith also played in the VFL.

Naismith also served in the Australian Army during World War II.

Notes

External links 

 
Herb Naismith's profile at Collingwood Forever

1915 births
1995 deaths
Australian rules footballers from Melbourne
Collingwood Football Club players
People from Clifton Hill, Victoria
Australian Army personnel of World War II
Military personnel from Melbourne